Veronika Kudermetova defeated Danka Kovinić in the final, 6–4, 6–2, to win the singles tennis title at the 2021 Charleston Open. Kudermetova did not drop a set en route to her first career Women's Tennis Association (WTA) singles title.

Madison Keys was the defending champion, but she lost in the second round to Sloane Stephens in a rematch of the previous tournament's quarterfinal. As all losing quarterfinalists were previous WTA title holders, all four semifinalists were in contention to become a maiden WTA champion.

Seeds
The top eight seeds received a bye into the second round.

Draw

Finals

Top half

Section 1

Section 2

Bottom half

Section 3

Section 4

Qualifying

Seeds

Qualifiers

Lucky losers

Draw

First qualifier

Second qualifier

Third qualifier

Fourth qualifier

Fifth qualifier

Sixth qualifier

Seventh qualifier

Eighth qualifier

References

External links
 Main draw
 Qualifying draw

2021 WTA Tour
2021